Events from the year 1757 in Scotland.

Incumbents

Law officers 
 Lord Advocate – Robert Dundas the younger
 Solicitor General for Scotland – Andrew Pringle of Alemore

Judiciary 
 Lord President of the Court of Session – Lord Glendoick
 Lord Justice General – Lord Ilay
 Lord Justice Clerk – Lord Tinwald

Events 
 77th Regiment of Foot (Montgomerie's Highlanders) raised as the First Highland Battalion by Maj. Archibald Montgomerie
 78th Fraser Highlanders raised as the Second Highland Battalion.
 Macfarlane Observatory established at the University of Glasgow; its instruments are set up by James Watt in his new capacity as the university's instrument maker.
 Physician Francis Home publishes The Principles of Agriculture and Vegetation, an early presentation of the chemical principles underlying plant nutrition, in Edinburgh.
 Final rebuilding of Douglas Castle begins.
 Ossian's Hall of Mirrors, a folly at Dunkeld, is built.
 First lighthouse on Little Cumbrae is built.
 Main defences of Fort George completed.
 Robert Adam surveys the ruins of Diocletian's Palace at Spalato in Dalmatia.

Births 
 27 February
 Andrew Macdonald, Episcopal clergyman, poet and playwright (died 1790)
 (baptised) – David Hume, advocate (died 1838)
 4 March – George Thomson, musician and collector of traditional music (died 1851)
 April – John Clerk, Lord Eldin, judge (died 1832)
 9 August – Thomas Telford, civil engineer (died 1834 in London)
 20 October – Robert Kerr, surgeon and writer (died 1813)
 13 November – Archibald Alison, Episcopal clergyman and essayist (died 1839)
 6 December – Sir David Baird, 1st Baronet, general (died 1829)
 James Bonar, lawyer and astronomer (died 1821)
 Robert Brown, agriculturalist (died 1831)
 Andrew Mitchell, admiral (died 1806 in Bermuda)

Deaths 
 19 January – Thomas Ruddiman, classical scholar, librarian and printer (born 1664)
 20 January – Robert Keith, Episcopal bishop and historian (born 1681)
 8 March – Thomas Blackwell, classical scholar (born 1701)

The arts
 William Burness builds Burns Cottage in Alloway; his son, the national poet Robert Burns, will be born here in January 1759.

See also 

 Timeline of Scottish history

References 

 
Years of the 18th century in Scotland
Scotland
1750s in Scotland